Beartooth Butte is in the Beartooth Mountains in the U.S. state of Wyoming. The peak is located in the Absaroka–Beartooth Wilderness of Shoshone National Forest. Unlike the granitic rocks that comprise the vast majority of rocks to be found in the Beartooth Mountains, Beartooth Butte consists mostly of sedimentary rocks. It has the most easily accessible rocks of the Beartooth Butte Formation a geologic formation that preserves fossils dating back to the Devonian period.

References

Mountains of Park County, Wyoming
Mountains of Wyoming
Shoshone National Forest